Emelda Musonda  (born 29 November 1994) is a Zambian footballer who plays as a defender for the Zambia women's national football team. She was part of the team at the 2014 African Women's Championship. On club level she played for Red Arrows F.C. in Zambia.

References

External links
 CAF player profile

1994 births
Living people
Zambian women's footballers
Zambia women's international footballers
Place of birth missing (living people)
Women's association football defenders
Red Arrows F.C. players